Ønskekonserten is a radio program produced by the Norwegian Broadcasting Corporation (NRK). It has been broadcast weekly since January 1950. The signature tune is Entry March of the Boyars, composed by Johan Halvorsen. Ønskekonserten is regarded as the most popular radio program in Norway ever.

References

NRK radio programs
1950 radio programme debuts
Music radio programs